Conospermum toddii, commonly known as the victoria desert smokebush, is a shrub endemic to Western Australia.

Description
It blooms between July and October producing white-yellow flowers.

Distribution
It is found on sand dunes in the Goldfields-Esperance region to the east of Kalgoorlie of Western Australia where it grows in sandy soils.

References

External links

Eudicots of Western Australia
toddii
Endemic flora of Western Australia
Plants described in 1876
Taxa named by Ferdinand von Mueller